Attorney General Cole may refer to:

Charlie Cole (lawyer) (born 1927), Attorney General of Alaska
Gordon E. Cole (1833–1890), Attorney General of Minnesota